Bona was launched in 1809. After the outbreak of war with the United Kingdom, Bona took to the sea twice. On her first voyage she cruised as a privateer, engaged in two actions, one of which resulted in taking a merchantman that she had to abandon. Her owners next sent her out as a letter of marque. During this voyage the British captured Bona.

Career
1st cruise: Captain John Dameron commissioned Bona as a privateer on 18 July 1812. In August Dameron twice had to deal with insubordination amongst his crew.

On 28 November the Baltimore  privateer  (fourteen 12 and 18-pounder carronades, two 9-pounder guns, and 130 men) was in company with Bona when they encountered the Falmouth mail packet Townshend, M'Coy, master, about seven leagues west of Barbados. After an engagement of an hour and a half, Townshend struck. She had her master killed, three men dangerously wounded, three severely wounded, and her captain and six men slightly wounded. The Americans gave Townshend up. She returned to Falmouth, arriving there on 2 February 1813. Townshend had 28 crew and passengers. Before she surrendered she threw here mails overboard but they were inadequately weighted and so floated where Bona could retrieve them. The Americans ransomed Townshend for $6,000.

On 28 November, Bona, of seven guns and 90 men, captured , Oberry, master, to windward of Barbados. Roe was sailing from Liverpool to Madeira. An American account stated that when Bona fired on Roe Bonas pivot gun burst. Dameron then put 29 officers and men into boats and they boarded Roe. There was some fighting but negligible casualties before Roe struck. Dameron sighted two strange sails coming up so he left the prize crew on Roe and sailed away in an attempt to draw the approaching vessels after him.

The British recaptured Roe and sent her into Barbados. Roe sailed from Barbados for Martinique on 30 December.

2nd cruise: Captain John Dameron commissioned Bona as a letter of marque on 7 January 1813. On this voyage too he had to deal with some insubordination.

Fate
 captured Bona on 13 March 1813. Bona had sailed from Havana for Baltimore with a cargo of coffee and logwood. Maidstone sent Bona into Bermuda.

Notes, citations, and references
Notes

Citations

References
 
 
 

1809 ships
Ships built in Baltimore
Privateer ships of the United States
Captured ships